David Marash, known as Dave Marash (born May 3, 1942), is an American television journalist known for his work at ABC News and Al Jazeera English.

Career
A graduate of Williams College , Marash worked at New Brunswick, New Jersey, station WCTC-AM (1450), where he hosted a nightly talk show, Dave Marash On Call. He had also been a reporter at WPIX. He did both news and sports reporting for WCBS Newsradio 88 and WNEW-FM in New York City. He subsequently worked at WCBS-TV in New York.

Marash was host of ESPN's Baseball Tonight and NBC's GrandStand, which alternated as a National Football League pregame show or a sports anthology series, depending on the season. In the early years of the Fox television network, Marash hosted a magazine-style show of science and technology entitled Beyond Tomorrow. 

He then worked at ABC News. His last appearance prior to joining Al Jazeera English was on Nightline. He had anchored newscasts at WNBC in New York and WRC-TV in Washington, D.C., during the mid-1980s. He received Emmy Awards for his Nightline coverage of the Oklahoma City bombing and for his coverage of the explosion of TWA Flight 800.  His May 2001 Nightline documentary about singer Eva Cassidy was one of the highlights of his years with the program.

Marash garnered considerable attention when he joined Al Jazeera English in January 2006 as the network's Washington, D.C., anchor, thus becoming the de facto American face of the new English-language station. Two years later, in March 2008, he stepped down from his position. Marash explained, "To put it bluntly, the channel that's on now—while excellent, and I plan to be a lifetime viewer—is not the channel that I signed up to do." Specifically, he cited the loss of editorial control and his inability to vouch for content that the network was broadcasting, as reasons for his departure.

On February 14, 2011, Marash defended Al Jazeera English on the O'Reilly Factor on Fox News against claims by Bill O'Reilly that Al Jazeera was anti-American. He joined Santa Fe, New Mexico, public radio station KSFR-FM 101.1 in March 2014 as co–news director.

Since September 2014, he has hosted the radio show and podcast Here & There: a four-times-weekly series of 50-minute news interviews.

Notes

References
"Hope for the Hirsute", time.com, July 6, 1970; accessed October 17, 2014.
Profile, msnbc.msn.com; accessed October 17, 2014.
"In Defense of 'Self-Hating' Jews" by Menachem Wecker, Jewish Currents, May 2007, which quotes Marash
A News Legend Comes Out Of Retirement

External links

1942 births
Living people
American television reporters and correspondents
Television anchors from New York City
New York (state) television reporters
Al Jazeera people
Williams College alumni
National Football League announcers
Major League Baseball broadcasters
National Hockey League broadcasters
Jewish American journalists
21st-century American Jews